Nicolas de L'Hôpital (or Hospital), marquis and later duc de Vitry, seigneur de Nandy et de Coubert, often referred to as Maréchal (or Marshal)  de Vitry (1581-1644 in Nandy) was a French noble, military leader,  friend of Louis XIII and Marshal of France (1617).

Biography

Family
Nicolas de L'Hôpital de Vitry was the elder son of Louis de L'Hospital and Franćoise de Brichanteau. His younger brother, François de L'Hôpital, marquis du Hallier, also became a marshal of France. They were both also the grandsons of yet another marshal of France, François de L'Hospital.

His wife was Lucrèce Bouhier de Beaumarchais, widow of Louis de Trémoille and sister-in-law of Charles de La Vieuville.

They had three children together.
Only one of them was a son and he became an ambassador to Bavaria.

Career
Like his father and his other ancestors, Vitry joined the army. Due to Henry IV's personal sympathy for Vitry's father, he let Vitry become a companion of the royal heir, the Dauphin (and later king) Louis. He quickly gained the child's favour. After the death of his father in 1611, he succeeded him in his position as captain of the 2nd (and 1st French) company of the Garde du corps du roi, the royal guard.

He played an important role in the assassination of Concino Concini in 1617. It was he who arrested Concini and shot him (with others) afterwards.

After this coup d'etat he was put (along with his brother and  Jean-Baptiste d'Ornano) in charge of the armies in the capital, in order to prohibit riots. In the following days, Vitry received Concini's title of marshal and was one of the few persons who had unrestricted entrance to the king's chambers.  Later in his life he became also Governor of Provence and Meaux.

In 1635, after decisions he had made in Provence against the will of the king, he was disgraced. 
In 1637, following an assault on Archbishop Henri de Sourdis, he was imprisoned in the Bastille and pardoned in 1643.

References

Marshals of France
17th-century French military personnel
Prisoners of the Bastille